Renato "Rene" Salud de Villa (born July 20, 1935) is a Filipino former police and military officer and government official. He served as Chief of Philippine Constabulary, Director-General of the Integrated National Police, and Chief of Staff of the Armed Forces of the Philippines. He then served as Secretary of National Defense under presidents Corazon Aquino and Fidel V. Ramos. He founded Partido para sa Demokratikong Reporma for his unsuccessful presidential bid in 1998. He then briefly served as Executive Secretary under President Gloria Macapagal Arroyo.

Early life and education
Renato de Villa was born on July 20, 1935, in San Juan, Batangas. He completed his elementary education at San Juan Elementary School, and completed high school at Batangas Eastern Academy, also in San Juan. He studied engineering for one year at the University of Santo Tomas in Manila before taking and passing the entrance exam for the Philippine Military Academy.

De Villa has a master's degree in Business Management from the Asian Institute of Management.

Career

Armed Forces of the Philippines
De Villa served as Chief of Philippine Constabulary and Director-General of the Integrated National Police in 1986 and was concurrent Vice-Chief of Staff of the Armed Forces of the Philippines in 1987. In 1988, he was promoted to Chief of Staff of the Armed Forces by President Corazon Aquino. In 1989, he  defended President Corazon Aquino against coup plots in Manila by Gregorio Honasan's Reform the Armed Forces Movement (RAM) and the siege of an army camp by Rizal Alih in Zamboanga City.

Awards in military service
  Presidential Medal of Merit (Philippines)
  Outstanding Achievement Medal
  Visayas Anti-Dissidence Campaign Medal
  Mindanao Anti-dissidence Campaign Medal
  Long Service Medal
  Disaster Relief & Rehabilitation Operation Ribbon
  Military Commendation Medal

Secretary of National Defense
In 1991, Fidel Ramos resigned as Defense secretary to run for president. Aquino appointed de Villa as his replacement. When Ramos won as president in 1992, he reappointed de Villa to the post.

1998 presidential election
In 1997, he resigned as Defense secretary and made his bid for the presidency. He joined Lakas-NUCD the same year to get Ramos' endorsement. De Villa was widely believed to be the preferred candidate of President Fidel V. Ramos, due to their long association in the Philippine Constabulary, shared experience in the EDSA Revolution, and appointment as Secretary of National Defense. However, in December 1997, Ramos endorsed House Speaker Jose de Venecia, Jr., who became the official presidential candidate of the party.

De Villa bolted the party and formed his own party called the Partido ng Demokratikong Reporma (Democratic Reform Party) and formed an alliance with the Lapiang Manggagawa (Labor Organization) as Reporma–LM. He chose Pangasinan Governor Oscar Orbos as his running mate and brought rebel members of Lakas to his party. Many criticized his actions, most of whom think that he basically cloned Ramos' career (Ramos did the same when he lost the nomination of the LDP). In the May 11 elections, he lost to Vice President Joseph Estrada and placed sixth overall in a field of 11 candidates.

Executive Secretary
De Villa reappeared in 2001 when the second EDSA People Power Revolution escalated and influenced active officers of the Armed Forces to withdraw support to President Joseph Estrada. When President Gloria Macapagal Arroyo assumed office, she appointed de Villa as her executive secretary. He resigned from the cabinet the succeeding year citing health conditions. In the 2004 elections, he formally withdrew alliance with Arroyo and endorsed Raul Roco as president. His party did not fill any candidates other than what was endorsed by Roco. Roco however lost to the incumbent Arroyo in the elections.

In July 2005, De Villa was speculated to be picked as transition president in case the opposition successfully ousted President Arroyo and Vice President Noli de Castro from their positions and form a revolutionary government. Those plans did not happen when the Arroyo impeachment was dismissed in the House of Representatives.

Personal life
As a young captain on the armed forces in the 1960s, De Villa would spend his leisure time at the Fort Bonifacio quarters of Eduardo Ermita, his classmate at the Philippine Military Academy. Also staying there was Monica "Monet" Barrica of Dipolog, a Philippine Airlines flight attendant and niece of Ermita's wife. De Villa married Barrica in 1968, a month before shipping out to Vietnam.

De Villa and Barrica had four children:
Ma. Mercedes Josefina de Villa Colet
Patrick Roland B. de Villa
Katherine Johanna de Villa Maravilla - President of Batangas Eastern Colleges (2008―2020).
Michael Celestino B. de Villa

Barrica was diagnosed with stage III malignant cancer in 1990, and died in September 2006 after a 16-year struggle. Her remains are buried in the Roman Catholic Cemetery in San Juan, Batangas.

See also
Department of National Defense (Philippines)
Philippine Constabulary

References

External links
Department of National Defense - Renato De Villa

|-

|-

1935 births
Living people
People from Batangas
Tagalog people
Philippine Constabulary personnel
Philippine Military Academy alumni
Candidates in the 1998 Philippine presidential election
Filipino generals
Filipino military personnel of the Vietnam War
Partido para sa Demokratikong Reporma politicians
Secretaries of National Defense of the Philippines
Chairmen of the Joint Chiefs (Philippines)
Executive Secretaries of the Philippines
Arroyo administration cabinet members
Ramos administration cabinet members
Corazon Aquino administration cabinet members
Asian Institute of Management alumni